Kindamba is a town in the Bas-Congo province of the Democratic Republic of the Congo, situated to the southwest of the capital, Kinshasa.

Transport 

It is served by a station on the Matadi-Kinshasa Railway.

See also 

 Railway stations in DRCongo

References 

Populated places in Kongo Central